Al-Haqel (also known as Bujaq) is a village in northern Syria, administratively part of the Aleppo Governorate, located northeast of Aleppo and south of district center Ayn al-Arab.

Geography 
Situated along the western banks of the Euphrates River, nearby localities include Sarrin to the north, Ras al-Ayn Qibli to the northeast. According to the Syria Central Bureau of Statistics (CBS), al-Haqel had a population of 2,054 in the 2004 census.

References

Populated places in Ayn al-Arab District